Edward R. Stanly House is a historic home located at New Bern, Craven County, North Carolina.  It was built about 1850, and is a Renaissance Revival style  brick dwelling with a three-story, side-hall plan rectangular main block and a two-story wing two bays wide and two bays deep.

It was listed on the National Register of Historic Places in 1972.

References

Historic American Buildings Survey in North Carolina
Houses on the National Register of Historic Places in North Carolina
Renaissance Revival architecture in North Carolina
Houses completed in 1850
Houses in New Bern, North Carolina
National Register of Historic Places in Craven County, North Carolina